The 2020 Gibtelecom Rock Cup was a single-leg knockout tournament contested by clubs from Gibraltar. There were thirteen clubs participating in the cup this season. The winner of the competition would have qualified to compete in the 2020–21 Europa League.

Europa were the defending champions after defeating Gibraltar United by a score of 3–0 in the previous season's final.

On 1 May 2020, the Gibraltar Football Association announced that the domestic football season had been terminated.

First round
The draw for the first round was held on 10 January 2020. 9 Gibraltar National League sides will enter at this stage along with Hound Dogs, who are competing in the 2019–20 Gibraltar Intermediate League. Three sides (St Joseph's, Lions Gibraltar and Boca Gibraltar) received byes to the second round.

Quarter–finals
The draw for the quarter–finals was held on 21 February 2020.

Semi-finals
Cancelled.

Final
Cancelled.

Scorers
.

7 goals

  Sunday Emmanuel (Lincoln Red Imps)

4 goals

  Labra (Europa)
  Pibe (Lincoln Red Imps)

3 goals

  Adrián Gallardo (Europa)
  Lukas Corner (Europa Point)
  Dean Dillon (Europa Point)
  Diego Díaz (Mons Calpe)

2 goals

  Willy (Europa)
  Fernando Velasco (Europa)
  Joshua Moody (Europa Point)
  Kyle Casciaro (Lincoln Red Imps)
  Jamie Coombes (Lincoln Red Imps)

1 goal

  Jaron Vinet (Bruno's Magpies)
  Alejandro Avilés (Europa)
  Manu Dimas (Europa)
  Jayce Olivero (Europa)
  Cian Collins (Europa Point)
  Omar El Yettefti (Europa Point)
  Diego Vera (Europa Point)
  Blas Álvarez (Lincoln Red Imps)
  Julian Del Rio (Lincoln Red Imps)
  Gato (Lincoln Red Imps)
  Bernardo Lopes (Lincoln Red Imps)
  Álvaro Oliver (Lincoln Red Imps)
  Scott Ballantine (Manchester 62)
  André Dos Santos (Mons Calpe)
  Juanfri (St Joseph's)

Own goals
  Jemar Matto (College 1975) vs Lincoln Red Imps
  Samuel Vermeeren (Europa Point) vs Mons Calpe

See also
2019–20 Gibraltar National League
2019–20 Gibraltar Intermediate League

References

External links
Gibraltar Football Association

Rock Cup
Rock Cup
Rock Cup
Rock Cup